Armenia competed at the 2019 World Aquatics Championships in Gwangju, South Korea from 12 to 28 July.

Diving

Armenia entered two divers.

Men

Swimming

Armenia entered four swimmers.

Men

Women

Mixed

References

Nations at the 2019 World Aquatics Championships
2019 in Armenian sport
Armenia at the World Aquatics Championships